Frederick Rawdon Dalrymple  (born 6 November 1930) is a former Australian public servant and diplomat.

Dalrymple was born in Sydney and educated at Shore School in North Sydney and the University of Sydney. In 1951, he was selected as the New South Wales Rhodes scholar for 1952 and went on to study at Oxford University in the United Kingdom.

Dalrymple joined the Department of External Affairs in 1957. He went on to appointments as Ambassador to Israel (1972–1975), Ambassador to Indonesia (1981–1985), Ambassador to the United States (1985–1989) and Ambassador to Japan (1989–1993).

In January 1987, Dalrymple was appointed an Officer of the Order of Australia in recognition of his public service as a diplomatic representative.

In 1994, Dalrymple retired from the foreign affairs department (by then the Department of Foreign Affairs and Trade).

In May 2007 he was awarded an Honorary Doctor of Science by the University of Sydney.  Among other things, the award cited his place as one of Australia's most distinguished post-war diplomats.

Publications
 1998. "Indonesia and the IMF: The Evolving Consequences of a Reforming Mission", Australian Journal of International Affairs, Vol 52(3), pp. 233–39.
 2003. Continental Drift: Australia's Search for a Regional Identity. Aldershot, Hampshire, UK: Ashgate.

References

Living people
1930 births
Place of birth missing (living people)
Australian Rhodes Scholars
Ambassadors of Australia to Israel
Ambassadors of Australia to Indonesia
Ambassadors of Australia to Japan
Ambassadors of Australia to the United States
Officers of the Order of Australia
University of Sydney alumni
People from Sydney
Alumni of the University of Oxford